Doda Dome is a granite dome west of the Tuolumne Meadows area of Yosemite National Park, to the northeast of Tenaya Lake.  It is a high dome, just northwest of Daff Dome, and may be identified by its mammalian appearance. It is named after Carol Doda, a famous Bay Area stripper.

It is a target of rock climbers, with a variety of routes given breast-related names such as "Tittely Winks" and "Bust It Out".

References

External links
 A rock climbing link

Granite domes of Yosemite National Park